Helms is an English and Danish Patronymic Surname and means son of Helm, which derives from the Old Norse name Hjelm or Hjälm meaning 'helmet'. The name may also be a short form of the English Toponymic Surname Helmsley after the town in North Yorkshire. It may refer to:

 Adam Helms (born 1974), American artist
 Bobby Helms (1933-1997), American country music singer Robert Lee Helms
 Chet Helms (1942-2005), American rock promoter, founder and manager of the rock band Big Brother and the Holding Company
 David H. Helms (1838–1921), Union Army soldier during the American Civil War and recipient of the Medal of Honor
 Don Helms (1927-2008), American country music steel guitarist
 Ed Helms (born 1974), American actor
 Gregory Helms (born 1974), American professional wrestler
 Hans G. Helms (1932–2012), German experimental writer, composer and social and economic analyst and critic
 Hermann Helms (1870-1963), American chess player, writer and promoter
 Jesse Helms (1921-2008), U.S. senator from North Carolina from 1973 to 2003
 Johannes Helms (1828-1895), Danish writer and headmaster
 John Henry Helms (1874-1919), United States Marine and a recipient of the Medal of Honor
 Johnny Helms (1935-2015), American jazz trumpeter
 J. Lynn Helms (1925-2011), President of Piper Aircraft Corp. and Administrator of the Federal Aviation Administration
 Laili Helms, the Taliban's best-known advocate in the West before the 9/11 attacks
 Mike Helms (born 1982), American former basketball player
 Paul Helms (1889-1957), founder of the Helms Bakery and co-founder of the Helms Athletic Foundation
 Richard Helms (1913-2002), CIA Director from 1966 to 1973
 Richard Helms (naturalist) (1842-1914) German-born Australian naturalist
 Susan Helms (born 1958), U.S. Air Force lieutenant general and astronaut
 Tommy Helms (born 1941), American former Major League Baseball player and manager
 Wes Helms (born 1976), American Major League Baseball player, nephew of Tommy Helms
 William Helms (died 1813), US Representative from New Jersey and Revolutionary War officer